Kvitholten Hill is a snow-clad hill at the east side of Austreskorve Glacier, standing just south of Sagbladet Ridge in the Mühlig-Hofmann Mountains of Queen Maud Land, Antarctica. It was plotted from surveys and air photos by the Sixth Norwegian Antarctic Expedition (1956–60) and named Kvitholten (the white grove).

References

Hills of Queen Maud Land
Princess Astrid Coast